The 2020–21 European Rugby Champions Cup (known as the Heineken Champions Cup for sponsorship reasons) was the seventh season of the European Rugby Champions Cup, the annual club rugby union competition run by European Professional Club Rugby (ECPR) for teams from the top six nations in European rugby. It was the 26th season of pan-European professional club rugby competition.

The tournament began on 11 December 2020. The final, originally scheduled to be held at the Stade de Marseille, took place on 22 May 2021 at Twickenham Stadium.

On 11 January 2021, EPCR suspended the tournament as a result of further public health restrictions due to the COVID-19 pandemic.

A revised format was announced on 24 February 2021.

Teams
Due to the COVID-19 pandemic delaying the end of the previous tournament twenty-four clubs from the three major European domestic and regional leagues would compete in the Champions Cup in a one-year exceptional basis. EPCR chief Vincent Gaillard confirmed the 24-team tournament in August 2020.

The distribution of teams is:
 England: eight clubs
 The top eight clubs in Premiership Rugby
 France: eight clubs
 The top eight clubs in the Top 14

 Ireland, Italy, Scotland, Wales: eight clubs
 The top four sides (not including the South African sides, which are ineligible for EPCR competitions) in both conferences in the Pro14.

While the 2019–20 Top 14 season was cancelled due to COVID-19, the Premiership and Pro14 resumed in August 2020. However, the Pro14 announced in June 2020 that their European representation would be decided by standings after round 13, the final series of games before the hiatus. The following teams qualified for the tournament via their league performance.

Team details
Below is the list of coaches, captain and stadiums with their method of qualification for each team.

Note: Placing shown in brackets, denotes standing at the end of the regular season for their respective leagues, with their end of season positioning shown through CH for Champions, RU for Runner-up and SF for losing Semi-finalist.

Seeding

The twenty four teams would be broken down into two pools of twelve. Originally, four rounds of inter-pool play was to be followed by a knockout stage, featuring two-legged quarterfinals, and single leg semi-finals and final (to be held in Marseille on 22 May 2021). However at suspension of the tournament in January 2021, only two rounds of the pool stage were completed and the revised format would introduce a round of 16 following these.

For the purposes of the pool draw, the clubs would be separated into tiers based on their league finishing position, and clubs from the same league in the same tier would not be drawn into the same pool. The number 1 and number 2 ranked clubs from each league will be in Tier 1, the number 3 and number 4 ranked clubs would be in Tier 2, the number 5 and 6 ranked clubs would be in Tier 3, and the number 7 and number 8 ranked clubs would be Tier 4.

The pool stage would feature the Tier 1 teams playing the Tier 4 teams in their pool (that are not from the same league) twice in a home or away manner, while the Tier 2 and 3 clubs would follow in a similar manner.

When the revised format was announced, the top eight teams from each pool would qualify for the knockout stage of the Champions Cup and teams finishing between 9th and 12th in each pool would join the Challenge Cup at the Round of 16 stage, joining eight qualifiers from the Challenge Cup pool stage. Due to the suspension in January 2021, only six weekends of play would be provided for, three less than in previous seasons.

Pool stage

 

The draw took place on 28 October 2020 at the Maison du Sport International in Lausanne, Switzerland. The 24 teams were draw into the two pools as follows, this also shows their opponents. Fixtures were announced on 13 November 2020.

Pool A

Pool B

Knockout stage
The knockout stage will commence with a round of 16 consisting of the top 8 ranked teams from each pool. Due to the truncation of the pool stage, a draw will be used to determine matches in both round of 16 and quarter-finals but no team will face a team from the same league in the round of 16. Teams which won both their matches and were not awarded points due to COVID cancellations would be guaranteed home advantage. Therefore, Bordeaux Bègles, Leinster, Munster, Racing 92 and Wasps will receive home advantage.

The draw for the round of 16 and quarter-finals took place on 9 March 2021 in Lausanne, Switzerland.

Bracket

Round of 16
Fixtures were announced on 16 March 2021.

Quarter-finals

Semi-finals
The draw for the semi-finals took place on 11 April 2021 at BT Sport's studios in London. As a result of the pandemic all matches will be held at the designated club's home ground.

Final

Notes

See also
 2020–21 European Rugby Challenge Cup

References

 
Champions Cup
European Rugby Champions Cup
European Rugby Champions Cup
European Rugby Champions Cup
European Rugby Champions Cup
European Rugby Champions Cup
European Rugby Champions Cup
European Rugby Champions Cup seasons